The women's team regu sepak takraw competition at the 2006 Asian Games in Doha was held from 2 December to 6 December at the Al-Sadd Indoor Hall.

Squads

Results 
All times are Arabia Standard Time (UTC+03:00)

Preliminary

Group X

|-
|rowspan=2|2 December||rowspan=2|12:00
|rowspan=2 align=right|
|rowspan=2 align=center|3–0
|rowspan=2 align=left|
|colspan=3|2–0||colspan=3|2–0||colspan=3|2–0
|-
|21–18||21–9|| ||21–12||21–7|| ||21–6||21–9||
|-
|rowspan=2|3 December||rowspan=2|12:00
|rowspan=2 align=right|
|rowspan=2 align=center|3–0
|rowspan=2 align=left|
|colspan=3|2–0||colspan=3|2–0||colspan=3|2–0
|-
|21–5||21–5|| ||21–4||21–4|| ||21–2||21–4||
|-
|rowspan=2|4 December||rowspan=2|12:00
|rowspan=2 align=right|
|rowspan=2 align=center|3–0
|rowspan=2 align=left|
|colspan=3|2–0||colspan=3|2–0||colspan=3|2–0
|-
|21–6||21–9|| ||21–6||21–12|| ||21–6||21–14||

Group Y

|-
|rowspan=2|2 December||rowspan=2|12:00
|rowspan=2 align=right|
|rowspan=2 align=center|3–0
|rowspan=2 align=left|
|colspan=3|2–0||colspan=3|2–0||colspan=3|2–0
|-
|21–19||21–18|| ||21–11||21–10|| ||21–13||21–17||
|-
|rowspan=2|3 December||rowspan=2|12:00
|rowspan=2 align=right|
|rowspan=2 align=center|2–1
|rowspan=2 align=left|
|colspan=3|0–2||colspan=3|2–1||colspan=3|2–0
|-
|19–21||17–21|| ||21–23||21–9||15–8||21–11||21–10||
|-
|rowspan=2|4 December||rowspan=2|12:00
|rowspan=2 align=right|
|rowspan=2 align=center|3–0
|rowspan=2 align=left|
|colspan=3|2–1||colspan=3|2–0||colspan=3|2–1
|-
|21–9||15–21||15–8||21–13||21–8|| ||21–13||18–21||15–12

Knockout round

Semifinals

|-
|rowspan=2|5 December||rowspan=2|09:00
|rowspan=2 align=right|
|rowspan=2 align=center|2–1
|rowspan=2 align=left|
|colspan=3|2–0||colspan=3|0–2||colspan=3|2–0
|-
|21–5||21–4|| ||17–21||16–21|| ||21–11||21–8|| 
|-
|rowspan=2|5 December||rowspan=2|12:00
|rowspan=2 align=right|
|rowspan=2 align=center|3–0
|rowspan=2 align=left|
|colspan=3|2–0||colspan=3|2–0||colspan=3|2–0
|-
|21–10||21–9|| ||21–12||21–11|| ||21–11||21–15||

Final

|-
|rowspan=2|6 December||rowspan=2|12:00
|rowspan=2 align=right|
|rowspan=2 align=center|1–2
|rowspan=2 align=left|
|colspan=3|1–2||colspan=3|2–0||colspan=3|1–2
|-
|21–13||14–21||11–15||21–12||21–15|| ||21–12||15–21||11–15

References 

Official Website
Squads

Sepak takraw at the 2006 Asian Games